Marcus Browne (born November 10, 1990) is an American professional boxer who fights at light heavyweight. As of December 2020, he was ranked the world's sixth best active light heavyweight by the Transnational Boxing Rankings Board, eighth by The Ring Magazine and seventh best by Boxrec.

Controversy 
On April 6, 2018, Browne was arrested for two domestic incidents. Authorities alleged that Browne had violated an order of protection by demanding entry to his ex-girlfriend's apartment and threatening to break in if she didn't obey his demands. The incident took place on March 30, 2018, while the order of protection against Browne was issued on December 28, 2017, after Browne had allegedly assaulted the woman in question. It was later revealed that Browne had been arrested once again for attacking his ex-girlfriend. He allegedly kicked in the woman's door and choked her. Browne later pleaded guilty to criminal contempt in the second degree on January 19, 2019, and was sentenced to 26 sessions of the batterer’s intervention program and a conditional discharge with a full order of protection.

On June 14, 2019, Browne was once again arrested, which was his fourth arrest in 18 months. He was charged with felony counts of criminal contempt and aggravated family offense, as well as misdemeanor counts of criminal trespass and criminal contempt. The arrest came five months after he had pleaded guilty to criminal contempt.

Professional career

Early career 
After competing at the 2012 Summer Olympics, where he lost in the first round to Damien Hooper, Browne made his professional boxing debut at the age of 21, on November 9, 2012 on Friday night as part of a Golden Boy Promotions card. The fight took place at the Fantasy Springs Casino in Indio, California against 33 year old Codale Ford (2-0) in a scheduled 4-round bout. Also on the undercard were future prospects making their professional debuts including Dominic Breazeale, Terrell Gausha, Errol Spence Jr and Rau'shee Warren. Browne won the fight via technical knockout in round 3, overcoming Ford's awkward style. Browne fought again a month later in December producing a first-round knockout win over Ritchie Cherry on the undercard of Amir Khan vs. Carlos Molina.

Browne fought a total of six times in 2013, which was his first full year as a professional. He won all six fight, with five of them coming inside the distance. He was taken the 8-round distance against Lamont Williams (5-1-1, 2 KOs) and won the scorecards that read (79-72, 79–72, 76-75). Browne began to fight regularly at the Barclays Center in Brooklyn, New York.

On April 19, 2014, Browne was scheduled to fight at the DC Armory in Washington against 36 year old former USBA light heavyweight champion Otis Griffin (24-15-2, 10 KOs). This was his biggest challenge at the time, stepping up in competition. Prior to the fight, Griffin was on a 5-fight losing streak. In round 5, Browne dropped Griffin following a straight left, however Griffin beat the count and took Browne the 8-round distance for the second time in his career. Browne won a shutout decision on the scorecards (80-71, 3 times). The fight took place on Shawn Porter's IBF welterweight title defence against Paulie Malignaggi.

Browne's next big challenge came in August 2014 against 36 year old Paul Vasquez (10-5-1, 3 KOs) at the Barclays Center. Browne won the fight via stoppage after 28 seconds into the opening round. In December 2014, Browne fight at the Pechanga Resort & Casino in Temecula, California against 40 year old veteran George Blades (23-6, 16 KOs). Blades was a late replacement and weighed 196.6 pounds, nearly 20 pounds heavier than the contracted weight limit. Browne was originally scheduled to fight Henry Buchanan, who pulled out after suffering an injury in training. The fight was also dropped from being televised. Browne, despite being heavily outweighed, won the fight via first round stoppage victory.

On April 11, 2015 Browne was matched with 36 year old Aaron Pryor Jr. (19-7-1, 12 KOs), son of hall of famer former Lineal light welterweight champion Aaron Pryor. The fight took place in front of 12,300 fans at the Barclays Center on the undercard of Danny Garcia vs. Lamont Peterson. Pryor Jr. retired on his stool at the end of round 6, giving Browne his 11th stoppage win in 14 professional fights.

A month later, on May 29, Browne fought again at the Barclays Arena on the Amir Khan vs. Chris Algieri undercard. His opponent, considered as his best opponent to date was Cornelius White (21-3, 16 KOs). White had lost his last two fights via stoppage, against Sergey Kovalev and Thomas Wiliams Jr., the latter who he fought in January 2014. In the fifth round, both fighters tumbled to the canvas. Browne used his fast hands and outworked White in most rounds, who moved well enough to survive the full ten rounds, but he was in survival mode the last three rounds. Browne went ten rounds for the first time, winning a clear unanimous decision (99-91, 99–91, 98-92).

Four months later in September, Browne fought Spanish boxer and former WBA light heavyweight champion Gabriel Campillo (25-7-1, 12 KOs) at the Foxwoods Resort in Ledyard, Connecticut. Campillo was dropped twice in the first round, the second time, the count was waived giving Browne his 8th first round stoppage win. Browne returned again three months later in December against Mexican boxer and former IBO super middleweight title challenger Francisco Sierra (26-9-1, 23 KOs). The fight took place at the Barclays Center on the Daniel Jacobs vs. Peter Quillin WBA middleweight title fight undercard. Browne controlled the fight from the opening bell, eventually stopping Sierra in round 4 via technical knockout.

Moving up the ranks

Browne vs. Kalajdzic 
It was announced that Browne would challenge for his first title, the vacant WBC USNBC light heavyweight title on April 16, 2016 against fellow undefeated 25 year old Radivoje Kalajdzic (25-0, 14 KOs) at the Barclays Center in an 8-round bout. The fight was originally scheduled for 10 rounds, but was cut to 8, minutes before the fight started, due to the main event following on. At the time of the fight, Browne was ranked number 7 by the WBA and number 13 by the WBC. Browne won the via a controversial split decision at the end of 8 rounds. Two judges scored the fight 76-74 and 76–75 in favour of Browne, whilst the third judge scored it 76-74 for Kalajdzic. There was controversy from the first round when Kalajdzic fell to the canvas. Browne was credited with the knockdown, although he never threw a punch. Referee Tony Chiarantano was stood behind Browne, most likely misjudged the decision to count the knockdown. In the replay, it shows that Browne landed a punch whilst Kalajdzic slipped. Browne was also dropped in the sixth round. Both fighters claimed they had won in the post fight press conference. A rematch, according to promoter Lou DiBella, was discussed. With the win, Browne won the vacant title.

The next day, Kalajdzic hit out at Browne, calling for a rematch, "I don't see how I lost. I was the aggressor. I showed my heart. If he feels like he beat me, give me the rematch." Browne later stated that he would not be giving Kalajdzic a rematch.

On January 3, 2017 it was announced that Browne would step up once again, this time against former world title challenger Thomas Williams Jr. (20-2, 14 KOs) on February 18. The fight took place at the Cintas Center in Cincinnati, Ohio. Browne defeated Williams, who lost his second consecutive fight. Williams was knocked down three times and eventually stopped in round 6 of the scheduled 10 round bout. A the time of stoppage, Browne was ahead on all three judges scorecards (49-43, 3 times), with Browne being deducted a point for hitting Williams after knocking him down with a jab. The referee counted to ten but quickly realized his error and gave Williams five minutes to recover and still counting the knockdown and taking the point. Browne earned a purse of $65,000 whilst Williams received the smaller amount of $35,000. Following the fight, Browne called out WBC and Lineal light heavyweight champion Adonis Stevenson, who had previously knocked out Williams.

Browne vs. Monaghan 
On May 23, 2017 it was announced that Browne would fight 35 year old Sean Monaghan (28-0, 17 KOs) at the renovated Nassau Coliseaum in Uniondale, New York on July 15, 2017. Original plans for was for Monaghan to challenge WBC and Lineal champion Adonis Stevenson, however he decided to fight Andrzej Fonfara instead. This was the first boxing event scheduled at the Coliseum since March 1986, which was headlined by Mike Tyson. Browne won the fight via second-round technical knockout. He started off the quicker of the two and it only took him 30 seconds into the first round following a straight left. Browne continued at the same pace in the second round landing a right hook which pushed Monaghan back. Browne then landed numerous punches unanswered whilst Monaghan was against the ropes. Referee Steve Willis immediately stepped in to stop the fight. Browne praised his good friend Monaghan in the post fight, "I want thank Sean for giving me the opportunity and taking the fight {...} This is a guy I got love for, but I just had to take care of business." He also called out WBC champion Adonis Stevenson. According to Compubox stats, Browne landed 42 of 105 punches thrown (40%), whist Monaghan only landed 9 of 52 thrown (17%). The whole card averaged 886,000 viewers on Fox.

In November 2017, the WBC ordered Browne vs. Oleksandr Gvozdyk (14-0, 12 KO's) as an eliminator for their light heavyweight title. According to Gvozdyk's manager Egis Klimas, Browne pulled out of the fight. In December, it was announced that Browne would appear on the Showtime televised undercard of Errol Spence's IBF welterweight title defence against Lamont Peterson IBF welterweight bout on January 20, 2018 at the Barclays Center in Brooklyn. His opponent was confirmed as Francy Ntetu (17-1, 4 KOs). Ntetu's sole defeat came in June 2016 against future WBC super middleweight champion David Benavidez. On fight night, Browne did not let Ntetu get into the fight, stopping him at 2 minutes and 15 seconds into the first round. Browne knocked Ntetu down with a right hand and left hook, which put him down flat on the canvas. Ntetu beat the count but ended up taking some hard shots to the head from Browne until referee Arthur Mercente stepped in and halted the fight.

On March 13, 2018 The Ring reported that rising contender Browne would likely challenge for his first world title against either Sergey Kovalev (32-2-1, 28 KOs) for the WBO title or IBF beltholder Artur Beterbiev (12-0, 12 KOs), where he was in a mandatory position. On March 18, a deal had been agreed for Kovalev to defend his WBO light heavyweight title against Browne at the Hulu Theater at Madison Square Garden in New York City on HBO. A date as early as June 23 was discussed but not finalized. On April 6, it was reported that Browne had been arrested for domestic violence, marking it the second time in four months he had been arrested. On April 18, Kovalev announced he would instead fight longtime WBC mandatory Eleider Álvarez in the summer of 2018.

On July 5, 2018 it was announced that Browne would return to the Nassau Coliseum in Uniondale, New York to appear on the undercard of Devon Alexander vs. Andre Berto on August 4. His opponent was confirmed as Dominican Republic boxer Lenin Castillo (18-1-1, 13 KOs) in a 10-round bout. Castillo was entering the fight with a 3-fight win streak, which saw all the wins come via stoppage. Despite a knockdown, Browne dominated Castillo over 10 rounds to win a unanimous decision. Browne started the fight at a steady pace. In round 5, as Browne was coming forward, he managed to land a few shots, at the same time, Castillo also landed a solid combination which saw Browne hit the canvas. Browne rose to his feet and did not look hurt. Castillo failed to carry on the momentum and Browne regained control of the fight using distance. The scores were 98–91, 98-91 and 97–92.

Browne vs Ntetu 
In his next fight, Browne fought Francy Ntetu. Browne dropped Ntetu in the first round, and Ntetu barely beat the count. Browne immediately tried to finish the fight early, unloading shots on Ntetu. The referee was forced to stop the fight, and Browne got the TKO first round win.

Browne vs Castillo 
On 4 August 2018, Browne fought Gilbert Lenin Castillo. Despite getting dropped in the fifth by Castillo, Browne managed to outbox his opponent through most of the fight, and earned a unanimous decision victory, 98-91, 98-91 and 97-92 on the scorecards.

Browne vs. Jack 
In November 2018, Browne called out Badou Jack (22-1-3, 13 KOs) to fight him in what was an 'open division' as both traded words on Instagram. Both boxers claimed they were available to take the fight next and a few days later, Jack stated he was open to fighting WBA champion Dmitry Bivol, after Bivol's successful defence against veteran boxer Jean Pascal. According to RingTV.com on November 26, a deal was close to being reached for Jack and Browne to fight on the Manny Pacquiao vs. Adrien Broner Showtime PPV undercard on January 19, 2019. On December 17, the fight was announced to take place on the PPV undercard, taking place at the MGM Grand Garden Arena in Paradise, Nevada. Although both were ranked highly with the WBC, the fight would be contested for the WBA Interim light heavyweight title. Browne was 'honored and a privileged' to be able to fight on a big PPV undercard. He was also excited with the opportunity of fighting his first big name on his way to becoming a household name.

Browne used his youth, speed and power advantage to pound out a one-sided 12 round unanimous decision win over Jack, who suffered a horrendous cut on his forehead in round 7. The judges’ scores were 117–110, 116-111 and 119–108 in Browne's favor. Both boxers started fight off slow, but it was Browne who managed to do more to win the early rounds. In round 7, following an accidental clash of heads, a vertical cut appeared on Jack's forehead, with blood streaming down. The head clash seemed to be initiated by Jack, who according to Browne, was coming forward with his head all fight. Jack had his best round in round 12, as he attacked Browne hard in landing some nice shots. At this point, Jack needed a knockout, but was not able to hurt Browne. He lacked the power, and had taken so much punishment. After the fight, Browne said, "He was a real tough competitor. He thought he would take me deep in the rounds and drown me but I came in shape. I used my athletic ability. I did what I do best -- box the crap out of people. I was too slick, too sharp." Jack did not stay long after the bout and was taken to a hospital. After being stitched up, Jack congratulated Browne, "I would like to thank all of the fans for your support! The cut was a nasty one, but I’m fine now, Alhamdulillah. Congrats to Marcus Browne who fought a great fight. Regardless of the cut he was the better man tonight. I am a warrior and will never quit. I dedicated this fight to the refugee children across the world who fight a much tougher fight than I did tonight. I will continue to fight for them until the end." Browne landed 145 of 515 punches thrown (28%) and Jack landed 66 of his 303 thrown (22%). Jack received $500,000 and Browne was guaranteed a $250,000 purse.

Browne vs Pascal 
On 3 August 2019, Browne fought former world champion Jean Pascal. Browne was outboxing and landing blows on Pascal in the opening rounds. Pascal managed to turn the fight around in the fourth round, dropping Browne with a perfectly timed right hook. After that, Browne continued timing Pascal well, consistently beating him to the punch. In round seven, Pascal upped his aggressiveness and managed to drop Browne two more times, from which Browne would manage to get up and survive the round. In the eighth round, Browne was severely cut after a clinch, and the ringside physician immediately stopped the fight. At the time of stoppage, all three judges had it 75-74 in favor of Pascal, who was declared the winner via technical decision.

Browne vs Grachev 
Browne returned to boxing following a near two-year absence from the sport to face Denis Grachev on April 20, 2021. Grachev, a former kickboxer, was seen as a stay-active fight, which wasn't supposed to present a challenge for Browne. The bout was announced for the untelevized undercard of the Frank Martin vs Jerry Perez lightweight clash. Browne was originally expected to face Gilberto Ramírez for the vacant interim WBC super middleweight title, before Ramírez withdrew from the bout on February 12, 2021. Browne, who entered the fight as a -10 000 favorite, beat Grachev by unanimous decision. Neither PBC nor Browne made mention of the contest afterwards.

Browne vs Beterbiev 
On August 20, 2021, the WBC ordered the unified light heavyweight champion Artur Beterbiev to defend his title against Browne. The pair was given until September 17, 2021, to reach a deal. On September 15, the WBC granted them an additional eleven days to come to terms, before a purse bid would be held. The purse bid was eventually won by Beterbiev's Top Rank, who offered $1 005 000 for the rights to promote the fight, while their bidding rivals TGB Promotions offered $1 000 001. The fight was scheduled for December 17, 2021, and was held at the Bell Centre in Montreal, Quebec, Canada. After appearing to lose the first three rounds, Beterbiev began to take over following an accidental clash of heads in the fourth round which left both fighters cut. Browne lost the fight by a ninth-round knockout, failing to raise in time to beat the ten-count after being dropped by a left uppercut. Browne was furthermore knocked down in the seventh round as well.

Professional boxing record

References

External links

Marcus Browne - Profile, News Archive & Current Rankings at Box.Live

|-

|-

Light-heavyweight boxers
1990 births
Living people
Sportspeople from Staten Island
Boxers from New York City
Boxers at the 2012 Summer Olympics
Olympic boxers of the United States
American male boxers
African-American boxers
21st-century African-American sportspeople